Sir Geoffrey George Arthur,  (19 March 1920 – 15 May 1984) was a British diplomat and academic administrator. After a career in the Foreign Office, he was Master of Pembroke College, Oxford, from 1975 until his death in 1984.

Early life and education
He was educated at Ashby-de-la-Zouch Grammar School and Christ Church, Oxford. His university education was interrupted by war service. He served in Egypt, Iran and Iraq, and on returning to Oxford, transferred from studying classics to Persian and Arabic. He graduated with first class honours.

Career
He joined the Foreign Office in 1947, serving in Baghdad, Ankara, Cairo and Bonn. He was Ambassador to Kuwait from 1967 to 1970. From 1970 to 1971, he was the last Political Resident in the Persian Gulf and oversaw the break up of the British territory in the Persian Gulf into the independent states of Bahrain, Qatar, and the United Arab Emirates. His final civil service appointment was as Chair of the Joint Intelligence Committee, serving between 1973 and 1975.

In 1975, he was elected Master of Pembroke College, Oxford. He was also on the governing body of Abingdon School from 1978.

Personal life
In 1946, Arthur married Margaret, daughter of T. A. Woodcock (former headteacher of Ashby School). They had no children.

He died on 15 May 1984, aged 64, after a short illness. A memorial serve was held at Christ Church Cathedral, Oxford.

References

External links
 

1920 births
1984 deaths
Military personnel from Leicestershire
British military personnel of World War II
People from Ashby-de-la-Zouch
Masters of Pembroke College, Oxford
Chairs of the Joint Intelligence Committee (United Kingdom)
Members of HM Diplomatic Service
Alumni of Christ Church, Oxford
Knights Commander of the Order of St Michael and St George
Ambassadors of the United Kingdom to Kuwait
Governors of Abingdon School
British expatriates in Iraq
British expatriates in Turkey
British expatriates in Egypt
British expatriates in Germany
British expatriates in Iran
British expatriates in the United Arab Emirates
British expatriates in Qatar
British expatriates in Bahrain
20th-century British diplomats